Saira Bano is a Pakistani politician who has been a member of the National Assembly of Pakistan since August 2018.

Political career

She was elected to the National Assembly of Pakistan as a candidate of Grand Democratic Alliance (GDA) on a reserved seat for women from Sindh in 2018 Pakistani general election.

External Link

More Reading
 List of members of the 15th National Assembly of Pakistan
 No-confidence motion against Imran Khan

References

Living people
Women members of the National Assembly of Pakistan
Pakistani MNAs 2018–2023
Grand Democratic Alliance MNAs
Year of birth missing (living people)
21st-century Pakistani women politicians